Sorting nexin-5 is a protein that in humans is encoded by the SNX5 gene.

This gene encodes a member of the sorting nexin family. Members of this family contain a phox (PX) domain, which is a phosphoinositide binding domain, and are involved in intracellular trafficking. This protein is a component of the mammalian retromer complex, which facilitates cargo retrieval from endosomes to the trans-Golgi network. It has also been shown to bind to the Fanconi anemia, complementation group A protein. This gene results in two transcript variants encoding the same protein.

Model organisms

Model organisms have been used in the study of SNX5 function. A conditional knockout mouse line, called Snx5tm1a(KOMP)Wtsi was generated as part of the International Knockout Mouse Consortium program — a high-throughput mutagenesis project to generate and distribute animal models of disease to interested scientists — at the Wellcome Trust Sanger Institute. Male and female animals underwent a standardized phenotypic screen to determine the effects of deletion. Twenty five tests were carried out on homozygous mutant adult mice, however no significant abnormalities were observed.

Interactions
SNX5 has been shown to interact with FANCA.

References

Further reading

Genes mutated in mice